Concertino may refer to:

Concertino (composition), a small or short concerto
Concertino (group), the group of soloists in a concerto grosso
Concertino (Janáček), a 1926 composition by Leoš Janáček
Concertino, a 1952 ballet by George Balanchine

See also
 
 Concertina, a musical instrument
 Concerto (disambiguation)

cs:Concertino